House Bill 2001 is an Oregon bill that allows for alternative, more economical types of housing in an effort to preserve outer-city rural areas, such as farms. The bill is especially aimed at reducing the pace of urban sprawl in densely populated cities such as Portland, Oregon, with non-traditional land use zoning.

Content 
 
On July 2, 2019, the state of Oregon passed House Bill 2001 which provides an alternative to single-family zoning. The bill is an example of inclusionary zoning and allow for more affordable housing to be built. The bill allows duplexes, triplexes, fourplexes, and cottage clusters (which are several smaller homes built around a community backyard or other green space) to be built on land zoned for single family homes in cities with over 25,000 residents. In cities with over 10,000 residents duplexes will be allowed on land zoned for single family homes. Approximately 2.8 million people of Oregon’s 4.1 million population live in areas that will be affected by this bill. The bill was signed into law by Governor Kate Brown on August 8, 2019 and will take effect in 2020.

Background 

Oregon has often been seen as a leader in non-traditional land use as they have had a statewide urban growth boundary since 1973. While Urban Growth Boundaries and in particular Portland’s have become more controversial lately, the idea is to prevent urban sprawl from growing into farmland directly outside of the city. Affordable housing has become an increasing problem in Portland and other US cities. HB 2001 is one way that Oregon is attempting to combat that.

This bill is similar to Minneapolis’s new housing policy that bans zoning for single family homes. A similar plan has been adopted into certain neighborhoods in Seattle. While Oregon’s plan is less extreme, it does not ban single family homes but simply makes it easier for alternatives to be built, it is the first bill of its type to be implemented at a state rather than local level. The bill passed through the house fairly quickly and easily. The bill’s main sponsor, Representative Tina Kotek, makes clear that this bill is about choice and providing more affordable alternatives rather than banning single family homes.

Criticism 

The bill has received criticism from both sides of the aisle. From the right opponents of the bill argue that the state should expand or get rid of the Urban Growth Boundary to combat the rising cost of housing rather than implement HB 2001. From the other side, people believe that it is not enough and that there will not be the short term effects that the city needs.

References 

Oregon law
Zoning in the United States